The Callahan Subdivision is a  CSX Transportation railroad subdivision within the Jacksonville Division  on the former Seaboard Air Line Railroad. The sub extends northward 20 miles from Baldwin, Florida, where the Jacksonville Terminal Subdivision's S Line and Florida Gulf & Atlantic Railroad meet just north of Baldwin Yard, a classification yard. According to Jacksonville Division Timetable Number 4 published in 2005, the sub runs from milepost SM 0.18 to milepost SM 20.0, where it joins the Nahunta Subdivision, a former Atlantic Coast Line Railroad, in Callahan, Florida.  The line serves as a bypass to Jacksonville.

Operation
The sub has three direct traffic control blocks (DTC), double tracks on its full entire route and two defect detector locations over its length. The second defect detector is found at milepost SM 12.3 and the second siding, Crawford, a  siding, runs from milepost SM 13.3 to SM 15.4. The three DTC blocks are Baldwin from milepost SM 0.18 to SM 5.0 followed by Fouraker from the SM 5.0 to SM 15.4 and last is Crawford from SM 15.4 to SM 20.0.

The sub crosses the Norfolk Southern Railway at milepost SM 15.5.

The subdivision's dispatcher is known as the JE Dispatcher on channel 14 and 32: 160.320 MHz and 160.590 MHz respectively.

History

The line was originally built by the Florida Railroad as part of a line that ran from Fernandina Beach to Cedar Key.  The first train ran in 1861.  The Florida Railroad would be acquired by the Florida Central and Peninsular Railroad by 1899.  The line would later become part of the Seaboard Air Line Railroad, who acquired the FC&P, in 1903.

In 1925, the Seaboard Air Line built the Gross Cutoff which ran from northeast from the line in Callahan to Gross. The line was then designated as the Gross Subdivision from Gross to Baldwin.  The Seaboard Air Line became the Seaboard Coast Line Railroad in 1967.  In 1980, the Seaboard Coast Line's parent company merged with the Chessie System, creating the CSX Corporation. The CSX Corporation initially operated the Chessie and Seaboard Systems separately until 1986, when they were merged into CSX Transportation.

Track east of Callahan to Yulee was abandoned in 1954, and the Gross Cutoff was abandoned in 1985.  The remaining Gross Subdivision from Callahan to Baldwin was then renamed the Callahan Subdivision as it is today.

See also
 List of CSX Transportation lines

References

CSX Transportation lines
Rail infrastructure in Florida
Seaboard Air Line Railroad
Transportation in Duval County, Florida
Transportation in Nassau County, Florida